The province of North Kalimantan in Indonesia is divided into kabupaten or regencies which in turn are divided administratively into districts, known as kecamatan.

The districts of North Kalimantan with the regency it falls into are as follows:

 Bahau Hulu, Malinau
 Betayau, Tana Tidung
 Bunyu, Bulungan
 Kayan Hilir, Malinau
 Kayan Hulu, Malinau
 Kayan Selatan, Malinau
 Krayan Barat, Nunukan
 Krayan Selatan, Nunukan
 Krayan Tengah, Nunukan
 Krayan Timur, Nunukan
 Krayan, Nunukan
 Lumbis Ogong, Nunukan
 Lumbis, Nunukan
 Malinau Barat, Malinau
 Malinau Kota, Malinau
 Malinau Selatan, Malinau
 Malinau Utara, Malinau
 Mentarang Hulu, Malinau
 Mentarang, Malinau
 Muruk Rian, Tana Tidung
 Nunukan Selatan, Nunukan
 Nunukan, Nunukan
 Peso Hilir, Bulungan
 Peso, Bulungan
 Pujungan, Malinau
 Sebatik Barat, Nunukan
 Sebatik Tengah, Nunukan
 Sebatik Timur, Nunukan
 Sebatik Utara, Nunukan
 Sebatik, Nunukan
 Sebuku, Nunukan
 Sei Menggaris, Nunukan
 Sekatak, Bulungan
 Sembakung Atulai, Nunukan
 Sembakung, Nunukan
 Sesayap Hilir, Tana Tidung
 Sesayap, Tana Tidung
 Sungai Boh, Malinau
 Tana Lia, Tana Tidung
 Tanjung Palas Barat, Bulungan
 Tanjung Palas Tengah, Bulungan
 Tanjung Palas Timur, Bulungan
 Tanjung Palas Utara, Bulungan
 Tanjung Palas, Bulungan
 Tanjung Selor, Bulungan
 Tarakan Barat, Tarakan
 Tarakan Tengah, Tarakan
 Tarakan Timur, Tarakan
 Tarakan Utara, Tarakan
 Tulin Onsoi, Nunukan

 
North Kalimantan

id:Kategori:Kecamatan di Kalimantan Utara